The Julius S. Held Collection of Rare Books is a research collection of 283 volumes which is held in the Library of the Clark Art Institute.

The collection was assembled over the course of his career by art historian Julius S. Held (1905–2002), a longtime professor at Barnard College, Columbia University (1937–1970), who was renowned internationally for his scholarship in sixteenth and seventeenth century Dutch and Flemish art and as a scholar of Rubens and Rembrandt.  Volumes include illustrations by artists such as Peter Paul Rubens, Albrecht Dürer, and Anthony van Dyck.  The books include works by Virgil and Ovid, versions of Aesop's Fables, as well as titles on astronomy, religion, natural history, and anatomy dating from the sixteenth through the nineteenth century, in a range of languages, including Greek, Latin, German, Italian, English, and French.  The collection also includes important art histories and early treatises on the emblem and iconology. 
 
Of note are the approximately 80 books that form the working core of Held's scholarly collection.  These texts include his manuscript annotations and commentary concerning provenance and identification of illustrations present in the texts and appear on the inside of covers, as marginalia, and as end notes on the fly leaves.  Also included are separate ephemera consisting of  Held’s notes on images within the works, along with letters, invitations, annotated dealer’s catalogs and offprints.

The collection is currently being digitized; recently added volumes can be viewed in the Clark Library Digital Collections. According to the Institute of Museum and Library Services press release of Grants to Museums in 2014: "The Sterling and Francine Clark Art Institute will digitize significant volumes from the Julius S. Held Collection of Rare Books, in the Clark Library, and make these materials available through the library's digital collections interface, the Internet Archive, the Getty Research Portal, the Massachusetts Digital Commonwealth, and the Digital Public Library of America. The museum will digitize 185 of the collection's 283 volumes and enhance cataloging and metadata for the more than 107,000 images in the collection, including a significant number of rare titles and unique volumes dating from the sixteenth through the nineteenth century. The project fulfills the museum's goal of collections stewardship by allowing access to these exceedingly rare volumes, ensuring their physical preservation while facilitating access and knowledge."

Accessibility
The collection is non-circulating. The digitized volumes of the Julius S. Held Collection of Rare Books are available online through the Clark Digital Collections, and at the  Internet Archive. Collection titles can be viewed in the Library Catalog.
To access rare volumes at the Clark Art Institute Library, it is necessary for researchers to telephone, email, or write in advance of their visit; contact information is located on the home page.

References

External links

Sterling and Francine Clark Art Institute Library Collection at Internet Archive
Sterling and Francine Clark Art Institute
Clark Library

Collections
Art collections in the United States
Former private collections in the United States
Painting

Rembrandt studies